Harry James Stephens (c. 1866 – 25 August 1947) was an Australian journalist with a long career, mostly in Victoria and New South Wales agricultural districts. He was with The Farmer & Settler of Sydney for fourteen years and while editing that paper created Australia's first Country Party; later was editor of rival newspaper The Land.

History
He was successively editor of the Melbourne War Cry and reporter for the Launceston Daily Telegraph, then founder and editor of the Launceston Federalist; editor of the Charlton Tribune; managing editor of the Numurkah Leader; sub-editor of Sydney's Sunday Times; editor of The Farmer & Settler, Sydney 1906–1920, in 1912, with decentralisation, rural development and defence its primary concerns.; proprietor and editor of the Ouyen Mail; founder and managing editor of the Sunraysia Daily, Mildura; proprietor of the Western Advertiser of Wentworth; publicity officer for the National Party in Sydney; editor of The Land, and Fruit Culture.

His last appointment was as executive of the A.B.C.'s Publicity Department.

References 

Australian journalists
Australian newspaper proprietors
Australian newspaper editors
1866 births
1947 deaths